L'ellet is a village in the Cavaellon commune of the Aquin Arrondissement, in the Sud department of Haiti.

It is located on a peninsula that reaches into the Baie des Flamands.

References

Populated places in Sud (department)